The concept of One Health is the unity of multiple practices that work together locally, nationally, and globally to help achieve optimal health for people, animals, and the environment.  When the people, animals, and environment are put together they make up the One Health Triad . The One Health Triad shows how the health of people, animals, and the environment are linked to one another. With One Health being a worldwide concept, it makes it easier to advance health care in the 21st century.  When this concept is used, and implied properly it can help protect and save the lives of both people, animals, and the environment in the present and future generations.

Background 
The origins of the One Health Model dates as far back as 1821, with the first links between human and animal diseases being recognized by Rudolf Virchow. Virchow noticed links between human and animal disease, coining the term "zoonosis."  The major connection Virchow made was between Trichinella spiralis in swine and human infections. It was over a century later before the ideas laid out by Virchow were integrated into a single health model connecting human health with animal health.

In 1964, Dr. Calvin Schwabe, a former member of World Health Organization (WHO) and the founding chair of Department of Epidemiology and Preventive Medicine at the Veterinary School at the University of California Davis, called for a "One Medicine" model emphasizing the need for collaboration between human and wildlife pathologists as a means of controlling and even preventing disease spread. It would be another four decades before the One Health became a reality with the 12 Manhattan Principles, where human and animal pathologists called for "One Health, One World."

The One Health Model has gained momentum in recent years due to the discovery of the multiple interconnections that exist between animal and human disease. Recent estimates place zoonotic diseases as the source 60% of total human pathogens, and 75% of emerging human pathogens.

Applying the One Health Model 
The One Health Model can constantly be applied with human and animal interactions. One of the main situations where One Health can be applied is with canine and feline obesity being linked to their owners and their own obesity. Obesity in canines and felines is not good for them nor is it good for humans. The obesity of humans and their animals can result in many health problems such as diabetes mellitus, osteoarthritis, and many others. In some cases if the obesity of the pet is too bad the pet may be removed from its owner and put up for adoption. The only solution for this issue is to encourage owners to have a healthy lifestyle for both them and their animals. Zoonotic Diseases is another situation that the One Health model can be applied to. This is talked about more in the Zoonotic Disease section.

One Health and Antibiotic Resistance 
Antibiotic resistance is becoming a serious problem in today's agriculture industry and for humans. One reason for this occurring resistance is that natural resistomes are present in different environmental niches. These environmental resistomes function as an antibiotic resistance gene. There are many questions and research that needs to be further done to find out if these environmental resistomes play a big role in the antibiotic resistance that is occurring in humans, animals, and plants. A recent study was done and reported that 700 000 annual deaths were caused by infections due to drug resistant pathogens   This study also reported that if unchecked, this number will increase to 10 million by 2050.  The National Antimicrobial Monitoring System is a system used to monitor antimicrobial resistance among bacteria that is isolated from animals that are used as food In 2013 they found that about 29% of turkeys, 18% of swine, 17% of beef, and 9% of chicken were multi drug resistant, meaning they had resistance to 3 or more classes of antimicrobials.  Having this resistance for both animals and humans makes it easier for zoonotic diseases to be transferred between them and also makes it easier for the resistance of these antimicrobials to be passed on. With this being said, there are many possible risk management options that can be taken to help reduce this possibility. Most of these risk management options can take place on the farm or at the slaughter house for animals. When it comes to humans, risk management has to be done by you yourself and you have to be responsible for good hygiene, up to date vaccinations, and proper use of antibiotics. With that being said, the same management on farms needs to be taken for proper use of antibiotics and only using them when it is absolutely necessary and improving the general hygiene in all stages of production. With these management factors added in with research and knowledge on the amount of resistance within our environment, antimicrobial resistance may be able to be controlled and help reduce the amount of zoonotic diseases that are passed between animals and humans.

Zoonotic Diseases and One Health 
Zoonosis or zoonotic disease can be defined as an infectious disease that can be transmitted between animals and humans. One Health plays a big role in helping to prevent and control zoonotic diseases.  Approximately 75% of new and emerging infectious diseases in humans are defined as zoonotic. Zoonotic diseases can be spread in many different ways. The most common known ways they are spread are through direct contact, indirect contact, vector-borne, and food-borne. Below in (Table 1) you can see a list of different zoonotic diseases, their main reservoirs, and their mode of transmission.

Table 1: Zoonotic Diseases

See also
Antibiotic resistance
Epidemiology
Exposome

References

1821 introductions
Animals and humans
Medical models